Harry Caray may refer to:

Harry Caray (1914–1998), American sportscaster
Skip Caray (1939–2008), his son, born Harry Caray, Jr. and also a sportscaster
Chip Caray (born 1965), his grandson, born Harry Caray III and also a sportscaster

See also
Harry Carey (disambiguation)